Giorgio Scalvini (born 11 December 2003) is an Italian professional footballer who plays as centre-back for  club Atalanta and the Italy national team.

Club career

Early career 
Having been born in Chiari, he commenced his career playing for the Palazzolo scuola calcio, to continue at Brescia at age of 10. He joined the Atalanta Youth Sector in 2015. On 8 November 2020, Scalvini was called up for a Serie A match against Inter Milan from the first squad's manager Gian Piero Gasperini, though remained an unused substitute.

Atalanta 
Scalvini debuted for Atalanta on 24 October 2021, aged 17, in a Serie A match draw 1–1 at home against Udinese, coming on as substitute in the 85th minute. On 7 April 2022, Scalvini debutted in the UEFA Europa League in a match drawn 1–1 against German club RB Leipzig. On 18 April, Scalvini scored his first goal in his career in Atalanta's 2–1 defeat to Verona.

International career 
Scalvini represented Italy internationally at under-15, under-16, under-17, and under-19 levels. 

He made his debut with the Italy U21 on 16 November 2021, aged 17, playing as a starter in a friendly match won 4–2 against Romania in Frosinone.

On 24 January 2022, Scalvini accepted a call-up by Italy national team manager Roberto Mancini to join the Azzurri for a three-day training camp in Coverciano. He made his debut with the senior national team as a second-half substitute in a 5–2 loss against Germany on 14 June 2022.

Style of play 
Scalvini is a centre-back who has a good technique and is good at headers with his height of 1.95 m. He has also been likened to Alessandro Bastoni.

Career statistics

Club

International

References

External links 
Profile at the Atalanta B.C. website
 

2003 births
Living people
People from Chiari, Lombardy
Sportspeople from the Province of Brescia
Italian footballers
Association football defenders
Italy international footballers
Italy under-21 international footballers
Italy youth international footballers
Serie A players
Atalanta B.C. players
Footballers from Lombardy